Mohammad Abdul Halim is a Bangladeshi former footballer who played as a striker in the Dhaka League and Bangladesh national football team during the mid 1970s. He scored three goals during the 1980 AFC Asian Cup qualifiers, and helped Bangladesh qualify for the main tournament for the first time ever. Halim was the joint–top goal scorer in the 1976 Dhaka League season, however, he never played for Bangladesh's big teams spending his club career in the top tier with PWD SC & Rahmatganj MFS.

Playing career
Halim's Dhaka career started with Holden XI in 1974. The following year, he played for the Fire Service in the Dhaka Second Division. In 1976, Halim got a chance to play top level of football in Dhaka, the Dhaka League. He joined office team PWD SC and became the joint–top goal scorer in the league with 13 goals alongside Hafizuddin Ahmed of Mohammedan SC. That year, Halim outscored established strikers Chunnu, Abdul Gaffar and Enayetur Rahman. Halim went onto join fellow league minnows Rahmatganj MFS.

Being the league's top scorer, he was called up to the Bangladesh national team in the same year and went to play in the King's Cup. Halim was also kept as a standby player for the 1978 AFC Youth Championship held in Dhaka, although he did not make it to the final list of selected players. Halim's start with the senior national team was promising. In 1979, Halim scored two goals against Afghanistan in the qualifying round of the Asian Cup in Dhaka, after Bangladesh fell two goals behind in the first half. He helped Bangladesh qualify for the 1980 AFC Asian Cup as he scored during a 3–2 win against Afghanistan during their third qualifying match in Dhaka. However, Halim's playing career came to an early end due to a knee injury.

Personal life
Born in Ishwarganj Upazila of the Mymensingh District, Halim has two sons, who were also former football players and played in the Dhaka Third Division Football League. After retiring from playing professional football, Halim joined the coaching profession, but did not  stick with it for too long.

In February 2022, Halim informed media that he has been suffering from a heart disease for a long time and his physical condition is gradually deteriorating. Along with that, Halim's previous knee injury from his playing days had still not gone away. He also informed that he is unable to get better treatment due to lack of money.

International goals

References

   
Year of birth missing (living people)
Date of birth missing
People from Mymensingh District
Bangladeshi footballers
Bangladesh international footballers
Rahmatganj MFS players
Association football forwards